Golden Bank is the first and one of the largest Asian American banks based in Texas. It is the second minority-owned bank in the Greater Houston area and one of the largest Asian American banks that are still privately owned. Golden Bank currently has branches in the Greater Houston area and Dallas-Fort Worth area and branches in California: Alhambra, Burlingame, Cupertino, Irvine, Millbra, Rowland Heights, and Tustin.

History
Golden Bank was first founded under the name of Texas First National Bank by a group of Taiwan immigrants in Houston on May 3, 1985.  The Bank changed its name to Golden Bank in 2006. Through continued efforts of directors, management, and employees, Golden Bank has achieved significant growth in total assets and profitability over the year and is recognized as a well-capitalized bank in the U.S. banking industry.

Overview
Golden Bank provides a full scope of commercial banking services including taking deposits, extending loans, providing trade finance, online banking, cash management, and other banking services to businesses and residents within its service areas over the past 30+ years.
Golden Bank’s goal is to provide not only qualified banking products but also to tailor its services to suit each of its customer's needs and deliver “an integrated approach of marketing and technical assistance to the people."

References

Banks established in 1985
Banks based in Texas
Chinese American banks
Companies based in Houston
1985 establishments in Texas
American companies established in 1985